The tríocha céad, also known as trícha cét, meaning "thirty hundreds", was a unit of land-holding in eleventh and twelfth century Ireland. The term appears to relate to the number of troops an area could raise.

Background
Described as a "spatial unit of royal tenure, taxation, local government, and military levy", the trícha cét largely corresponded to a local petty kingdom ruled by a petty king. A minority, however, were ruled by a taisaig (leader)  or an airríg (governor), appointed by a superior kings.

In the province of Ulster, a tríocha céad was subdivided into roughly twenty-eight baile biadhtaigh (ballybetagh), meaning "lands of a food-provider", and around 463 seisrigh/seisreachs, meaning "six-horse plough-teams".

During the eleventh century, the system became established across the island, a refinement on a pre-existing system.

See also
Townland
Carucate
Túath

References

Further reading

External links
 The Triocha Céts

11th century in Ireland
12th century in Ireland
Former subdivisions of Ireland
Irish words and phrases